Anthocarapa is a monotypic genus of tree in the family Meliaceae. The natural range of the one accepted species extends from eastern Malesia, Australia to the western Pacific Ocean.

The single species, Anthocarapa nitidula is known colloquially in Australia as incense cedar. It is a medium to large tree in subtropical rainforest, north from Woodburn in New South Wales.

It is dioecious, with male and female flowers on separate plants. Leaves are compound with 2–6 obovate to oblong-elliptic, smooth, somewhat glossy, somewhat thick leaflets.

References

External links

Meliaceae
Meliaceae genera
Monotypic Sapindales genera
Sapindales of Australia
Flora of New South Wales
Flora of Queensland
Dioecious plants